The Wau Holland Foundation (German: Wau Holland Stiftung; WHS) is a nonprofit foundation based in Hamburg, Germany.

It was established in 2003 in memory of Wau Holland, co-founder of the Chaos Computer Club. Loosely connected with the Chaos Computer Club,  the foundation aims to preserve and further Holland's ideas in fields such as technology assessment, the history of technology and freedom of information. Specifically, it promotes the use of electronic media for educational purposes.

Foundation projects include the "Archive of Contemporary History of Technology (Hacker archive)", which documents the history of the hacker scene, and a campaign against voting machines (both in collaboration with the Chaos Computer Club). The foundation also processes donations in Europe to support the WikiLeaks organization and Julian Assange's defense.

As of December 2010, their endowment was about 62,000 €. It also owns land (valued at about 1500 €), currently leased to a public institution.

Relationship to WikiLeaks 

Between October 2009 when it began accepting donations on WikiLeaks' behalf and December 2010, the foundation has collected over $1.9 million USD.  On 4 December 2010, PayPal turned off donations in response to the foundation's connection to WikiLeaks, alleging that the account was being used for "activities that encourage, promote, facilitate or instruct others to engage in illegal activity." On 8 December 2010 the foundation released a press statement, saying it has filed legal action against PayPal for blocking its account and for libel due to PayPal's allegations of "illegal activity."

As a consequence of this activity of collecting donations for Wikileaks, its charitable status has been challenged and later revoked by the German authorities. Its charitable status has been reinstated on 12 December 2012, applied retroactively for 2011 and 2012.

Andy Müller-Maguhn is Vice President of the Wau Holland Foundation and a friend of Julian Assange's.

Proceeds from the AssangeDAO are processed by the Wau Holland Foundation.

References

External links
"About the Wau Holland Foundation", Wau Holland Foundation web site.
2003 establishments in Germany
Charities based in Germany
Information technology organisations based in Germany
Intellectual property activism
Non-profit organisations based in Hamburg
Organizations established in 2003
Science and technology think tanks
WikiLeaks